Gagea tenera is an Asian species of flowering plants in the lily family. It is native to Xinjiang, Central Asia, the Western Himalayas, Iran, Turkey, and South Caucasus.

Gagea tenera is a bulb-forming herb up to 15 cm tall. Flowers are yellow- or yellow-green.

References

External links

tenera
Flora of Asia
Plants described in 1904